Daviesia spinosissima is a species of flowering plant in the family Fabaceae and is endemic to the south of Western Australia. It is a shrub with crowded, rigid, sharply-pointed, narrowly triangular phyllodes, and yellow and red flowers.

Description

Taxonomy
Daviesia spinosissima was first formally described in 1844 by Carl Meissner in Lehmann's Plantae Preissianae. The specific epithet (spinosissima) means "very spiny".

Distribution and habitat
This daviesia grows in heath in near-coastal areas of southern Western Australia between Narrikup, Denmark and near Mount Manypeaks in the Esperance Plains, Jarrah Forest and Warren biogeographic regions of south-western Western Australia.

Conservation status
Daviesia spinosissima is listed as "not threatened" by the Government of Western Australia Department of Biodiversity, Conservation and Attractions.

References

spinosissima
Taxa named by Carl Meissner
Plants described in 1844
Flora of Western Australia